Lisa Raymond and Samantha Stosur were the defending champions, but Stosur chose not to participate, and only Raymond competed that year.
Raymond partnered with Elena Likhovtseva, but lost in the quarterfinals to Květa Peschke and Rennae Stubbs.

Katarina Srebotnik and Ai Sugiyama won in the final 7–5, 4–6, [10–3] against Cara Black and Liezel Huber.

Seeds

Draw

Finals

Top half

Bottom half

External links
Draw

Sony Ericsson Open - Women's Doubles, 2008
2008 Sony Ericsson Open